This is a list of Gibson brand of stringed musical instruments, mainly guitars, manufactured by Gibson, alphabetically by category then alphabetically by product (lowest numbers first). The list excludes other Gibson brands such as Epiphone.

Guitars

Acoustic guitars

 Advanced Jumbo
 B series
 Chet Atkins SST
 Hummingbird
 Dove
 Gospel
 J Series
 J-160E
 J-45
 J-180
 J 200
 Gibson L Series
 L-00
 Gibson L-1
 Gibson L-4
 Southern Jumbo

Electric guitars

Hollowbody and Semi-Hollowbody guitars

 B. B. King Lucille
 Byrdland
 Citation
 CS Series
 CS-336
 ES Series
 ES-5
 ES-125
 ES-135
 ES-137
 ES-140
 ES-150
 ES-165
 ES-175
 ES-225
 ES-295
 ES-325
 ES-330
 ES-333
 ES-335
 ES-339
 ES-345
 ES-350T
 ES-355
 ES-359
 L-4
 L-5
 Super 400

Solid-body guitars

 335-S
 Blueshawk
 Chet Atkins CEC (Cutaway Electric Classical)
 Corvus
 EDS-1275
 Explorer
 Firebird
 Flying V
 Futura
 GK-55
 L-5S
 L-6S
 Les Paul
 Custom
 Doublecut
 Junior
 Special
 Studio
 Gothic
 Swamp Ash
 Voodoo
 The Paul

 Little Lucille
 Marauder
 Melody Maker
 Moderne
 Nighthawk
 RD
 Robot Guitar
 S-1
 SG
 Special
 Junior
 Sonex
 Spirit

Bass Guitars

EB-0
EB-1
EB-2
EB-3
G3
Grabber
Les Paul
Ripper
Thunderbird
Victory

Amplifiers
Gibson Falcon

Mandolin Family

Acoustic
F-5

Banjos
See Prewar Gibson banjo and American Banjo Museum

Other equipment
P-90
PAF

See also
 Gibson Brands

References

External links
 Official Gibson Guitar Company website
 

 
Lists of musical instruments
Gibson Guitar Corporation